Fate motif refers to a musical motif in a number of different works:

Symphony No. 5 (Beethoven)
Carmen (opera by Bizet)
Symphony No. 6 (Mahler)
Pelleas und Melisande (Schoenberg)
Symphony No. 8 (Shostakovich)
Oboe Concerto (Strauss)
Symphony No. 4 (Tchaikovsky)
La forza del destino (opera by Verdi)
Die Walküre (opera by Richard Wagner)

Musical terminology